Sucker Creek is a stream in geographic Osborne Township in the Unorganized North Part of Nipissing District in Northeastern Ontario, Canada. It is in the Saint Lawrence River drainage basin and is a tributary of Little Sucker Lake. Sucker Creek forms part of the border of Jocko Rivers Provincial Park.

Course
Little Sucker Lake flows via the Jocko River and the Ottawa River to the Saint Lawrence River. The creek has one, unnamed right tributary, arriving mid-course from an unnamed lake.

See also
List of rivers of Ontario

References

Rivers of Nipissing District